Jorge Avendaño (born Jorge Avendaño Lührs) is a Mexican pianist, composer, songwriter and music producer.

He has written music for many telenovelas including the 1993 version of Corazón salvaje for which he wrote its theme song, as well as the theme song and music for Amarte Asi.  He has produced albums for Ana Bárbara, Patricia Manterola and Edith Márquez, for which he wrote the song "Enamorada" that was featured in the film Y tu mamá también.

Life

He has written songs and/or recorded a lot of top Latin artists, with such personalities as Plácido Domingo (Alborada, 2006), Sarah Brightman and Fernando Lima ("Passion" soap opera main title), Edith Márquez, Mijares, Ricardo Montaner, Los Nocheros, Carlos Cuevas, Pepe Aguilar, Pedro Fernández, Limite, Charlie Zaa, Francisco Cespedes, Cristian Castro, Barry Ivan White, Fabián Chávez, etc.

He has composed also classical music for symphony orchestra and small ensembles, and he was a prominent member of the Spanish Society of Authors and Composers (SGAE) since 1996; He is an active member of BMI since 2020.

Albums
Boleros: Por Amor y Desamor (1995)

Films
 La metiche (1990)

Telenovelas

Incidental music
 Prohibido Amar (2011)
 Vivir a Destiempo (2012)
 Quererte Asi (2012)
 La Mujer de Judas (2012)
 Emperatriz (2011)
 Profugas del Destino (2010)
 La Loba (2010)
 Mujer Comprada (2009)
 Vuelveme a Querer (2009)
 Eternamente Tuya (2009)
 Amarte así (2005)
 Gitanas (2004)
 Mujer bonita (2001)
 Alborada (2005)
 La esposa virgen (2005)
 La madrastra (2005)
 Alma rebelde (1999)
 Infierno en el Paraíso
 Desencuentro (1997)
 Gente bien (1997)
 Morir dos veces (1996)
 Corazón salvaje (1993)
 Yo compro esa mujer (1990)
 Laberintos de pasión (1999)

Original score
 Mariana de la noche (2003)
 Amor real (2003)
 Ladrón de corazones (2003)
 Niña... amada mía (2003)
 Entre el amor y el odio (2002)
 La intrusa (2001)
 Abrázame muy fuerte (2000)
 Amor gitano (1999)
 Por tu amor (1999)
 La Antorcha Encendida (1998)
 El privilegio de amar (1998)

Theme songs

External links
 

1960 births
Living people
Mexican composers
Mexican male composers
Mexican people of German descent
Mexican people of Spanish descent
Mexican pianists
Mexican male songwriters
Male pianists
21st-century pianists
21st-century male musicians